The Senior CLASS Award is presented each year to the outstanding senior NCAA Division I Student-Athlete of the Year in women's soccer.  The award was established in 2007.

References

External links
Official site

 
College soccer trophies and awards in the United States
Senior CLASS Award Soccer Women
Sports awards honoring women
Soccer in the United States lists
Association football player non-biographical articles